Aspherical may refer to:

 Aspherical space, a concept in topology
 Aspherical lens, a type of lens assembly used in photography which contains an aspheric lens, sometimes referred to as ASPH